Ultimate Cake Off is an American television series that aired on TLC. The show is based on professional cake artists that go "head-to-head" in constructing cakes over five feet tall with the assistance of a team of chefs, designers etc. for a money prize. Season one of the series, hosted by Michael Schulson, premiered on August 3, 2009. Season two, hosted by George Duran, premiered on February 1, 2010. Professional bakers Margaret Braun and Leigh Grode join the hosts as judges.

Gameplay
Each competition involves three teams of bakers, in which they have 9 hours to make cakes for a particular client—all of them must meet minimums on height and food content. Each cake is judged for three criteria: client satisfaction, technical difficulty and aesthetic appeal. Each competition also has a taste test, in which four judges (Braun, Grode, the host and the client) taste a sample of the bakers' cakes; the winner of this round has the right to select the team that should sit out for thirty minutes. (Some episodes also feature a skills test, in which each baker decorates a small cake, also for the right to take a team out for thirty minutes). After time runs out, each team moves their cakes to the judging room, where the four judges deliberate on the qualities and faults of each cake. The cake with the most votes wins $10,000, plus display at the client's event.

Notable contestants
Dana Herbert, a baker from Bear, Delaware, participated in a Season 1 competition for Legoland California; he did not win. In 2011, he would become the first champion of TLC's Next Great Baker, in which he would become an intern for Buddy Valastro at Carlo's Bake Shop.

Series overview

Episodes

Season 1

Season 2

Special

References

2009 American television series debuts
2000s American cooking television series
2010s American cooking television series
Food reality television series
Media about cakes
English-language television shows
TLC (TV network) original programming